Damián Macaluso Rojas (born March 9, 1980 in Montevideo) is a Uruguayan footballer of Spanish and Italian descent. He plays as a defender for Montevideo Wanderers.

Before joining AS Nancy in summer 2006, he also played for Racing Club de Montevideo, Club Atlético River Plate (Uruguay). He played in Guatemala for Cobán Imperial and helped them win the 2004 Clausura tournament.

In June 2012 he signed with Peñarol.

External links

1980 births
Living people
Footballers from Montevideo
Uruguayan footballers
Uruguay under-20 international footballers
Uruguayan people of Spanish descent
Uruguayan sportspeople of Italian descent
Uruguayan expatriate footballers
Central Español players
Racing Club de Montevideo players
U.C. Sampdoria players
Catania S.S.D. players
Cobán Imperial players
Venezia F.C. players
A.S. Sambenedettese players
C.D. Veracruz footballers
Club de Gimnasia y Esgrima La Plata footballers
Peñarol players
Liverpool F.C. (Montevideo) players
Juventud de Las Piedras players
Montevideo Wanderers F.C. players
Uruguayan Primera División players
Serie B players
Serie C players
Ligue 1 players
Primera Nacional players
Association football defenders
Expatriate footballers in Argentina
Expatriate footballers in Guatemala
Expatriate footballers in Mexico
Expatriate footballers in France
Expatriate footballers in Italy
Uruguayan expatriate sportspeople in Argentina
Uruguayan expatriate sportspeople in Guatemala
Uruguayan expatriate sportspeople in Mexico
Uruguayan expatriate sportspeople in France
Uruguayan expatriate sportspeople in Italy